Compass is a studio album by American jazz saxophonist Joshua Redman. It was released on January 13, 2009 via Nonesuch Records label to a critical success, scoring 83% on Metacritic.

Reception
Michael Kabran of PopMatters stated "After Back East, it seemed a certainty that Redman would return to his more traditional jazz and fusion roots, that he had gotten experimentation out of his system. He proved this critic wrong by forging ahead, for the most part successfully, into less-traveled terrain (at least on the mixing board). Now, it's anyone's guess, whether you're a trained expert or a musical novice, as to where Redman's compass will take him next. And perhaps that's Compass's most emphatic point of all."

Thom Jurek of Allmusic wrote "Joshua Redman's 2007 album Back East rightfully drew critical comparisons to Sonny Rollins' legendary trio date Way Out West, given everything from the mirror image implication in the title to the manner in which Redman offered the material on the set. The presence of Rollins looms large over Compass as well... on Compass, Redman has finally learned the greatest trick from his mentor -- to walk out on the wire with his horn more, trust the fluid abilities of his incredible rhythm section(s), and let his inner sense of song and freedom take precedence over his already well-established sense of discipline."

Daryl Easlee of BBC added "Bleak, emotional and full of gravity, Compass is the sort of serious-minded album that gives jazz in 2009 a very good name".

Track listing

Personnel
Musicians
Joshua Redman – soprano saxophone, tenor saxophone
Larry Grenadier – bass
Reuben Rogers – bass
Brian Blade – drums
Gregory Hutchinson – drums

Production
Joshua Redman – producer
James Farber – producer, engineer (recording, mixing)
Justin Gerrish – assistant engineer (recording)
Rick Kwan – assistant engineer (mixing)
Greg Calbi – engineer (mastering)

Karina Benznicki – production supervisor
Eli Cane – production coordination
John Gall – design
Ronen Givony – editorial coordinator
Michael Wilson – photography

Charts

References

External links
 

Joshua Redman albums
2009 albums
Post-bop albums
Nonesuch Records albums